Clint Freeman (born 16 August 1973 in Launceston, Tasmania), is an athlete from Australia, who competes in compound archery. He was the 2003 world champion.

References

1973 births
Living people
Australian male archers
World Archery Championships medalists
Competitors at the 2001 World Games
20th-century Australian people
21st-century Australian people